Jani Tapani Virtanen (born 6 May 1988) is a Finnish former professional footballer who played as a striker.

Career 
Born in Turku, Finland, Virtanen played with Turun Palloseura in Finnish Veikkausliiga between 2004 and 2006. He transferred to Udinese in the summer of 2006, at the age of 18, signing a five-year contract. On 23 December 2006, Virtanen became the fifth Finnish player ever to play in Serie A when he was substituted in for the last three minutes against AC Milan. Virtanen also had two Finnish teammates at Udinese, Roman Eremenko and Jarkko Hurme. In 2008, he was loaned to Sorrento, then to FC Khimki.

In 2010, he played for FC TPS and their reserve team, Åbo IFK, before moving to JJK Jyväskylä in July. Virtanen then moved to RoPS on a one-year contract.

References

External links
 
 Profile at RoPS 

1988 births
Living people
Association football forwards
Finnish footballers
Finnish expatriate footballers
Expatriate footballers in Italy
Expatriate footballers in Russia
Turun Palloseura footballers
Rovaniemen Palloseura players
Veikkausliiga players
Udinese Calcio players
FC Khimki players
Serie A players
Russian Premier League players
Åbo IFK players
Footballers from Turku